Terry Golway is a historian, author, and a journalist, having served as a columnist and editorial board member for The New York Times and a long-time editor and writer at The New York Observer.

Career
In 2010, Golway discovered a historic early census count predating the creation of the United States at Liberty Hall National Historic Landmark at Kean.  He is the author of several books on American and Irish history.

Golway's book on John F. Kennedy, JFK: Day by Day, was made into an iPad app to celebrate the 50th anniversary of Kennedy's inauguration.

Golway is an occasional op-ed columnist for The New York Times, where he was once a member of the editorial board. Previously, he spent two decades at The New York Observer.  he still writes periodic pieces for the “pink paper of lore” (The New York Observer); he  served as a political reporter, city editor and columnist for that paper in earlier years.

Books authored
JFK: Day by Day: A Chronicle of the 1,036 Days of John F. Kennedy's Presidency
Washington's General: Nathanael Greene and the Triumph of the American Revolution
Give 'Em Hell: The Tumultuous Years of Harry Truman's Presidency, in His Own Words
Ronald Reagan's America: His Voice, His Dreams, and His Vision of Tomorrow
So Others Might Live: A History of New York's Bravest
Together We Cannot Fail: FDR and the American Presidency in Years of Crisis
Irish Rebel: John Devoy and America's Fight for Ireland's Freedom
Full of Grace: An Oral Biography of John Cardinal O'Connor 
For the Cause of Liberty: A Thousand Years of Ireland's Heroes
Machine Made: Tammany Hall and the Creation of Modern American Politics
Frank and Al: FDR, Al Smith, and the Unlikely Alliance That Created the Modern Democratic Party

References

Living people
21st-century American historians
Kean University faculty
The New York Observer people
The New York Times columnists
Rutgers University alumni
American male non-fiction writers
Year of birth missing (living people)
Historians from New York (state)